Gottlieb Heise (23 March 1785 – 20 June 1847) was a German organ builder. In 1894, the renowned Alexander Schuke Potsdam Orgelbau company emerged from his Potsdam workshop.

Life 
Born in Querfurt, Electorate of Saxony, Heise was trained by Georg Christian Knecht in Tübingen. In 1820, he went to Potsdam and opened an organ workshop at 50 Charlottenstraße Heise was held in high esteem by the Prussian government, which promoted him. After his death in 1847, Carl Ludwig Gesell, who had previously been Heise's first assistant for eight years, took over the company.
.

Carl Schultze, Friedrich Hermann Lütkemüller, Friedrich Kienscherf and probably also Georg Mickley were among his students.

Heise died in Potsdam, Kingdom of Prussia at the age of 62.

Buildings (selection) 
Today, 30 new organs are known to have been built by Gottlieb Heise, mainly in the Mittelmark region, as well as rebuilds and repairs. Some smaller instruments have been preserved.

New organ buildings

Weitere Arbeiten

References

Further reading 
 Alexander Schuke Potsdam Orgelbau GmbH: 100 Jahre Alexander Schuke Orgelbau in Potsdam. thomasius verlag – Thomas Helms, Schwerin 1994.
 Gottlieb Heise. In Uwe Pape, Wolfram Hackel, Christhard Kirchner (ed.): Lexikon norddeutscher Orgelbauer. Volume 4. Berlin, Brandenburg und Umgebung. Pape Verlag, Berlin 2017.

External links 
 Gottlieb Heise Institut für Orgelforschung
 Chronik von A. Schuke-Orgelbau
 21 Heise-Orgeln Orgeldatabase (niederländisch)
 Johann Gottlieb Heise Organindex, Orgeln

Remarks 

German pipe organ builders
1785 births
1847 deaths
People from Querfurt